Armed is a 2018 action film written and directed by Mario Van Peebles. It stars Van Peebles and William Fichtner.

Premise
Chief, a U.S. Marshal born on the 4th of July, is left traumatized after leading undercover agents in a raid gone horribly wrong. Dismissed as insane by many, Chief is convinced that he was exposed to chemicals during the raid which are affecting his mind. Chief's symptoms include the sensation of being surrounded by or covered in cockroaches. When he begins receiving visits from his old team member Jonesie, he fears that Jonesie's anger and instability will bring harm to those around him.

Cast

Mario Van Peebles as Chief
William Fichtner as Richard
Ryan Guzman as Jonesie
Columbus Short as Turell
Dionne Warwick as Shirley
Laz Alonso as Jessie
Charles Halford as Meth
Eugene Cordero as Himself
Lane Garrison as Merc
Jemma Dallender as Grace
Brad Carter as Shep/Stew
Paul Rodriguez as Hector
DC Young Fly as G Money
Melvin Van Peebles as Grandpa V
Alena Savostikova as Nadia
Kiami Nichols as Cat
Sam Littlefield as Max
Christopher Michael as Anchor
Folake Olowofoyeku as Frida
Justin Nesbitt as Actor
Shakira Barrera as KC
Rocsi Diaz as Maria
Earthquake as Two Samiches
Cheryl Dent as News Anchor
Anna Talakkottur as Kashi
Joe Rudy Guerrero Jr. as Body Guard
Cameron MacKenzie as Stacey Bastion
Desiigner as Himself
Van Jones as Himself
Mandy Newton as Stacy Double
David Kenneth Sommerville as Wedding Guest
Mark Oby Brown as Party Goer
Roland Martin as Melvin
Dennis Nicomede as Wedding Guest
Ryan P. Shrime
Geoffrey Ross as U.S. Marshal
Tony Hua as Journalist

Production
The working title of the film was If.

Release
The film was released on September 14, 2018. Domestic distribution was handled by GVN Releasing and foreign distribution was handled by Hannibal Pictures.

References

External links

2018 films
2018 action films
2010s English-language films
American action films
Hood films
Films directed by Mario Van Peebles
Films scored by Larry Groupé
United States Marshals Service in fiction
2010s American films